Takumi Arena is an arena in Odate, Japan, neighboring Odate Jukai Dome. It opened in 2005 and holds 2,100 people. Takumi Electric Industry acquired its naming rights in 2017.

Facilities
Main arena - 2,394m2 (38m×63m)
Sub arena - 660m2 (33m×20m)
Training room
Running course

Attendance records
The record for a basketball game is 3,006, set on May 17, 2019, when the Alvark Tokyo defeated the Happinets 97–77.

Access
From Odate Station : Shishigamori Kanjosen of Shuhoku Bus . Get off at Jukai Dome-mae. Shuhoku Bus for Kosaka. Get off at Jukai Dome Iriguchi.

External links

References

Akita Northern Happinets
Sports venues in Akita Prefecture
Indoor arenas in Japan
Basketball venues in Japan
2005 establishments in Japan
Sports venues completed in 2005
Volleyball venues in Japan
Ōdate